This article is a list of episodes from Space Symphony Maetel: Galaxy Express 999 Side Story, an anime OVA series created by Leiji Matsumoto.  The OVA series was first aired in Japan from 6 August to 29 October 2004 on the Animax PPV Premier channel on the SkyPerfecTV satellite system in Japan. The series was created in order to bridge the gap between Galaxy Express 999 (1974) and Maetel Legend (2000) and was subsequently released on DVD.

The opening theme song was "Everlasting Dream" by Taro Hakase, and the ending theme was "Galaxy Legend" by Takako Uehara.

Episode list

Space Symphony Maetel
Leiji Matsumoto